Corwin was a Canadian drama television series which aired on CBC Television from 1969 to 1971.

Premise
Psychiatrist Greg Corwin (John Horton) established a general practice for the inner city. Other regular characters included Corwin's older assistant Doc James (Alan King), Mrs. Mackie or "Mac" (Ruth Springford) and Sergeant Bromley (Robert Warner).

The debut episode, "Does Anybody Here Know Denny?", guest starred Margot Kidder. Kidder was nominated for the Canadian Film Award for Best Actress in a Non Feature for her performance, and Springford won the Canadian Film Award for Best Supporting Actress in a Non-Feature for the same episode.

Scheduling
Hour-long episodes were broadcast Sundays at 9:00 p.m. (Eastern) from 5 October to 2 November 1969 in the first season, and 22 November 1970 to 3 January 1971 for the second and final season.

The second season's run of Corwin was complicated by its inclusion in the Sunday at Nine timeslot which became a mixture of drama, variety—such as The Hart and Lorne Terrific Hour—and documentaries.

Although Corwin received a significant budget, the series consistency was hampered by the departures of director René Bonnière and writer Sandor Stern.

References

External links
 
 

CBC Television original programming
1969 Canadian television series debuts
1971 Canadian television series endings
1960s Canadian drama television series
1970s Canadian drama television series